Potito Starace (born 14 July 1981) is an Italian retired professional tennis player on the ATP Tour. He achieved a career-high singles ranking of world no. 27 on October 15, 2007. He was a clay court specialist, and was coached by Umberto Rianna.

Starace was banned from tennis for life by the Italian Tennis Federation and by the Tennis Integrity Unit for betting offences.

Career

One of the most memorable runs of Starace's career was when he made the men's doubles semifinals of the 2012 French Open, partnering Daniele Bracciali, before succumbing to top seeds Daniel Nestor and Max Mirnyi.

In singles, he made four ATP finals but lost in all of them. On the Challenger tour, he won the San Marino CEPU Open three times, a record for the tournament, and the Tennis Napoli Cup four times, also a record. Its also noticed the match at the tennis club Napoli against the well known couple called "cugini di campagna",where potito and his friend Volandri lost and after this retired from the professional career. In doubles, he won six ATP titles.

He represented Italy at the 2008 Beijing Olympics, where he lost to eventual gold medallist Rafael Nadal in the first round.

Betting scandal
Following Alessio di Mauro's 9-month ban in November 2007, Starace and Daniele Bracciali were each fined and given short suspensions from playing. Starace received a fine of £21,400 and a 6-week ban from January 1, 2008.

Starace's case revolved around his final in Casablanca against the Spaniard Pablo Andújar, which the Italian lost. Starace had led their head-to-head 5-0 going into the match. Bookmaker Massimo Erodiani asked via Skype if Starace had received a certified cheque to lose the match and received an affirmative answer, explaining that all bets were safe on a Starace loss.

In 2015, the Italian Tennis Federation banned Bracciali and Starace for life. In 2019, he was banned by the Tennis Integrity Unit for life, subject to appeal to the Court of Arbitration for Sport.

ATP career finals

Singles: 4 (0–4)

Doubles: 9 (6–3)

Performance timelines

Singles 
Current through 2015 French Open.

 Doubles Current through 2013 Wimbledon Championships.

Top 10 wins 
 Starace has a 2–23 (.080) record against players who were, at the time the match was played, ranked in the top 10.

References

External links
 
 
 
 

1981 births
Living people
Hopman Cup competitors
Italian male tennis players
Olympic tennis players of Italy
Sportspeople from the Province of Avellino
Sportspeople banned for life
Sportspeople involved in betting scandals
Tennis players at the 2008 Summer Olympics
Match fixers